St Mary's Church or its full name St Mary on the Sea Church is a Roman Catholic Parish Church in Grimsby, Lincolnshire. It was built from 1880 to 1883. It is situated on the corner of Heneage Road and Wellington Street in the town centre. It was designed by Hadfield and Son and is a Grade II listed building.

History

Construction
In 1858, Sir John Sutton, a local landowner bought the site for the church, but died before building on it started. In 1880, more than thirty years after the purchase of the site, did construction begin. The majority of the cost was paid for by Thomas Young of Kingerby Hall, who also paid for the building of several other churches in Lincolnshire. The church was designed by Matthew Ellison Hadfield and his son Charles Hadfield, who was also the architects for Salford and Sheffield cathedrals. The initial plan for the church was that it would be double the size of what was built, but it would have been too expensive, so a smaller than planned church was built. On 19 August 1883, the church was opened by the Bishop of Nottingham, Edward Bagshawe.

The sacred heart altar was designed by Pugin & Pugin. It was given to the church by Georgina Fraser, the daughter of George Heneage and sister of Baron Heneage.

The church has some stained-glass windows designed by the studio Hardman & Co.

Reordering and redecoration
In 1908, wall paintings were added to the sanctuary. They were made in the studio of Nathaniel Westlake. Other paintings were added in the 1930s, such as a dado frieze depicting fish that went along the interior perimeter of the church.

In the 1960s, the wall paintings were covered over with paint. In 1979, the church was reordered and a new altar and lectern were installed. In 1983, a narthex was created at the back of the church.

In the 2000s, efforts were made to uncover the wall paintings. In addition, the organ, from the 1920s was also restored.

Parish
St Mary's Church has one Sunday Mass in Polish at 9.00 am and one in English at 11.00 am. At the church, during the week there are usually Masses at 7.00 pm m on Wednesday and 10.00 am on Thursday.

See also
 Roman Catholic Diocese of Nottingham

References

External links

 Parish site

Grade II listed churches in Lincolnshire
Roman Catholic churches in Lincolnshire
Saint Mary
Roman Catholic churches completed in 1883
Grade II listed Roman Catholic churches in England
Gothic Revival architecture in Lincolnshire
Matthew Ellison Hadfield buildings
19th-century Roman Catholic church buildings in the United Kingdom
1833 establishments in England